The Institute of Practitioners in Advertising (IPA), incorporated by a Royal Charter, is the trade body and professional institute for agencies and individuals working in the UK's advertising, media and marketing communications industry.

History
Founded in 1917 as the Association of British Advertising Agents, it was succeeded in 1927 by the Institute of Incorporated Practitioners in Advertising to secure further professional status and recognition for its members. In 1954, it changed to its current name, the Institute of Practitioners in Advertising, so that individuals as well as corporate bodies could be members. The IPA was awarded a Royal Charter in December 2015. This came into effect officially when it was sealed on 13 April 2016. The Charter is displayed at the IPA's London office. As of September 2021, the IPA had 268 agency members.

Role
IPA members account for over 85 per cent of the media spend in the UK. It covers all aspects of the agency business: creative, digital marketing, direct marketing, healthcare, media, out-of-home advertising, sales promotion and sponsorship sectors.

The IPA says its role is to promote the value of media, marketing and advertising agencies. It is a spokesman for the industry. It also runs a number of programmes to define, help and maintain the highest possible standards of professional practice. This includes award schemes such as the IPA Effectiveness Awards, best practice guidelines, and surveys including the quarterly IPA Bellwether Report (compiled by Markit Economics), and annual IPA Agency Census. The 2021 Census, for example, revealed the COVID-19 pandemic's impact on UK advertising agencies, with overall declines in staff numbers, particularly affecting women, older and younger workers, plus an ethnicity pay gap and agency failures to meet the IPA's diversity targets.

IPA members participate in the IPA's programme of continuing professional development. They have access to over 80 training courses, a variety of online and offline qualifications programmes and a full range of advisory services. It also offers professional accreditation to anyone who undertakes a minimum number of its qualifications.

The IPA is a member of the UK's Advertising Association. It is active in the creative industries' joint partnership with government under the Creative Industries Council umbrella.

Organisation
The IPA is governed by a council of elected members, a third of whom are up for re-election each year. Its president, who serves a two-year term, is currently (from March 2021) Julian Douglas, international CEO and vice chairman of VCCP (part of Chime), who succeeded Publicis Sapient's Nigel Vaz. Day-to-day, the IPA is led by its director-general, Paul Bainsfair, who succeeded Hamish Pringle in 2011.

References

Advertising trade associations
Marketing organizations
1917 establishments in the United Kingdom
Organisations based in the City of Westminster
Organizations established in 1917
Practitioners in Advertising